Epinotia brunnichana is a moth of the family Tortricidae. It is found in most western, central and northern Europe, the Near East and further east to the eastern Palearctic realm, where it has been recorded from Russia, Kazakhstan, China, and Japan.

The wingspan is .This species is very variable in colour, and dissection of the genitalia is the only safe way to determine specimens.  It usually has a large, pale (often white) spot at the dorsal edge of the forewings, this is sometimes edged with black.

Adults are on wing from July to October depending on the location.

The larvae roll the leaves of Betula, Corylus and Salix species and feed inside.

References

External links
UKmoths
Lepidoptera of Belgium
Fauna Europaea

Eucosmini
Moths of Asia
Moths of Europe
Moths of Japan
Moths described in 1767
Taxa named by Carl Linnaeus